The 2018 Cal State Fullerton Titans baseball team represented California State University, Fullerton in the 2018 NCAA Division I baseball season as a member of the Big West Conference. The team was coached by Rick Vanderhook and played their home games at Goodwin Field.

Previous season

The Titans finished 39–24 overall, and 15–9 in the conference. In the postseason, the Titans were invited and participated in the 2017 NCAA Division I baseball tournament, where they defeated BYU and Stanford twice in Stanford, California, then Long Beach State twice in Long Beach, California, and finally losing to Florida State and Oregon State in the College World Series in Omaha, Nebraska.

MLB draft selections

The Titans had seven individuals selected in the 2017 MLB draft.

Roster

Schedule

References

Cal State Fullerton
Cal State Fullerton Titans baseball seasons
Cal State Fullerton
2018 NCAA Division I baseball tournament participants